Keisha-Dean Soffe (born 28 September 1982 in Waitara, New Zealand) is a New Zealand weightlifting competitor.

Soffe won the bronze medal in the Women's + 75 kg category at the 2006 Commonwealth Games.

References

1982 births
Living people
New Zealand female weightlifters
Commonwealth Games bronze medallists for New Zealand
Weightlifters at the 2002 Commonwealth Games
Weightlifters at the 2006 Commonwealth Games
People from Waitara, New Zealand
Commonwealth Games medallists in weightlifting
21st-century New Zealand women
Medallists at the 2006 Commonwealth Games